The Leoš Janáček International Competition in Brno (hereinafter referred to as MSLJ) is a music competition held annually by the Faculty of Music of the Janáček Academy of Performing Arts in Brno. The MSLJ was named after the famous composer Leoš Janáček.

Ten disciplines, piano, organ, violoncello, double-bass, flute, clarinet, string quartet, violin, French horn and tuba, rotate in five-year cycles.

There is an age limit of 36 (on the opening day of the competition) for the solo disciplines; for string quartets, the sum of members’ ages must not exceed 140 years.

References

External links
 Page of the competition - CZ
 Page of the competition - EN
 Page of the Faculty of Music of the JAMU - CZ
 Page of the Faculty of Music of the JAMU - EN

Music competitions in the Czech Republic